Tanjung, or also commonly known as Tanjung Tabalong, is a town and district, which orms the administrative centre of Tabalong Regency in the Indonesian province of South Kalimantan.

Etymology and names

The origin of the Tanjung name was originated from some local stories told by generations since the 1940s. The name came from the jungle explorers who used to search for some open areas for farming until their feet were hurt by stepping on Tataba thorns. They screamed and ask for help, in which in the local language (Banjar language), it is called Tahalulung.

History

 The Kingdom of Tanjungpuri was built in Tanjung by the old Malay people in 520.
 Empire of Japan conquered the city in 1942.
 Tanjung City General Attack war in 1949.

Geography

Tanjung district is located on a relatively flat plain in the northern region of South Kalimantan. It borders Haruai, Murung Pudak and Tanta districts in the east, Bintang Ara district in the north, Kelua district in the south and Central Kalimantan province in the west.

Government

Tanjung is one of the twelve districts (kecamatan) of Tabalong Regency. The other eleven districts are Banua Lawas, Bintang Ara, Haruai, Jaro, Kelua, Muara Harus, Muara Uya, Murung Pudak, Pugaan, Tanta and Upau.

As the administrative centre of Tabalong Regency, Tanjung houses some of the important government institutions, including the Legislative Council of Tabalong and the office of the Tabalong Regent.

Tanjung district is divided into 15 administrative divisions, which consist of 4 urban villages (kelurahan) and 11 rural villages (desa).

Urban villages
 Agung
 Hikun
 Jangkung
 Tanjung

Villages
 Banyu Tajun
 Garunggung
 Juai
 Kambitin
 Kambitin Raya
 Kitang
 Mahe Seberang
 Pamarangan Kiwa
 Puain Kiwa
 Sungai Pimping
 Wayau

Economy

Trading

The Mabuun trading center is the center of business for the people in the city.

Oil mining

Oil has been discovered in the region since 1898, and the oilfield is being operated by Pertamina, Indonesia's national oil and gas company.

Coal mining

The main economy of the region is coal mining activities currently operated by Adaro Energy, world's fourth largest coal producer company, which covers the area of both Tabalong and neighboring Balangan. It is currently employing 12,110 workers within the company, subsidiaries and contractors.

Demographics

In 2010, the population of Tanjung is around 32,458, with 16,405 male population and 16,053 female population. The density is around 110 people per square kilometer.

Places of interest

Tanjung has many interesting tourist objects, such as:
Bauntung Mall Market
People's Stage
Tanjung City Park
Tanjung Grand Mosque
Tanjung History Memorial Monument
Tanjung Kencana National Hero Memorial Park
Tanjung Puri Torch Tower etc.

Currently the government of Tanjung is planning to build a five-hectare integrated entertainment and sport area Tanjung City Center (TCC) which consists of theater, futsal field, basketball field, water park, dry park, open stage and art market. Besides that, there will be supermarket, shops and restaurants as well.

Sports

Major sporting venues in the city and surrounding areas include the Mustika Sport Center, Tanjung Golf Field, Pembataan Tanjung Sport Complex etc.

Transportation

Roads
Tanjung is accessible via road connected from Banjarmasin, the capital of the South Kalimantan province. People in Tanjung mostly drive their own cars or motor bikes.

Air
Tanjung is also accessible via air through its only small domestic airport, the Warukin Airport , located at the neighboring Tanta subdistrict. The only current continuous operating airline in the airport is Airfast Indonesia serving Tanjung to Banjarmasin.

Public transit

Tanjung is currently being served by one public vehicle terminal called the Mabuun Terminal. This terminal serves several destinations of city in South Kalimantan and East Kalimantan such as Banjarmasin, Balikpapan, Barabai etc. However, with the future plan of constructing the TCC, Mabuun Terminal will be relocated from its current place to a new place.

Education

Tanjung is the home to the newly built Banjarmasin State Polytechnic which was opened in 2011.

See also
 South Kalimantan

References

Coal towns
Populated places in South Kalimantan
Regency seats of South Kalimantan